Jacinto Alberto Espinoza Castillo (born November 24, 1969 in Bahía de Caráquez) is an Ecuadorian former football goalkeeper.

Club career
He spent the majority of his professional career playing for a number of clubs in Ecuador, including powerhouses Emelec and LDU Quito, with whom he won national titles with. He played one season in Peru for Alianza Lima.

International career
From 1992 to 1994, he was a number of the Ecuador national team amassing 38 caps.

Honors
Emelec
Serie A: 1994
LDU Quito
Serie A: 1998, 1999, 2003, 2005 Apertura

References

1969 births
Living people
People from Manabí Province
Ecuadorian footballers
Ecuador international footballers
Association football goalkeepers
C.S. Emelec footballers
Club Alianza Lima footballers
Delfín S.C. footballers
L.D.U. Quito footballers
C.D. ESPOLI footballers
Manta F.C. footballers
C.S.D. Macará footballers
Deportivo Azogues footballers
Ecuadorian expatriate footballers
Expatriate footballers in Peru
Ecuadorian expatriate sportspeople in Peru
1993 Copa América players
1995 Copa América players
2004 Copa América players